Daryl or Darryl Hall may refer to:

 Darryl Hall (bassist) (born 1963), American jazz bassist
 Darryl Hall (defensive back) (born 1966), American football player
 Daryl Hall (born 1946), American musician and lead vocalist of Hall & Oates